Siswa Bazar railway station is a railway station on Muzaffarpur–Gorakhpur main line under the Varanasi railway division of North Eastern Railway zone. This is situated at Siswa Bazar in Maharajganj district of the Indian state of Uttar Pradesh.

References

Railway stations in Maharajganj district
Varanasi railway division